William Gameson was a professional rugby league footballer who played in the 1890s.

References

External links

 Search for "Gameson" at rugbyleagueproject.org

Place of birth missing
Place of death missing
Rugby league centres
English rugby league players
Wakefield Trinity players
Year of birth missing
Year of death missing